

Flora

Plants

Arthropods

Insects

Archosauromorphs

Pseudosuchians

Non-avian dinosaurs
Data courtesy of George Olshevsky's dinosaur genera list.

Birds

Plesiosaurs

References

 
1990s in paleontology
Paleontology